Herbert Alexander Miller (October 28, 1875 – June 14, 1937) was a Major League Baseball pitcher. He played in the National League for the 1897 Louisville Colonels.

External links

1875 births
1937 deaths
Major League Baseball pitchers
Baseball players from Michigan
Louisville Colonels players
19th-century baseball players
Kalamazoo Celery Eaters players
Kalamazoo Kazoos players
Kalamazoo Zooloos players
New Castle Quakers players
Youngstown Puddlers players
Stratford Poets players
Dayton Veterans players
Wheeling Stogies players